University of Illinois Ice Arena, also known as the Big Pond, is an ice arena and recreational sport facility in Champaign, Illinois, and owned and operated by the University of Illinois at Urbana–Champaign. The arena serves as the home for the Illinois Fighting Illini men's and women's college ice hockey teams that competes in the American Collegiate Hockey Association. The men's ice hockey team competes at the ACHA Division I level as a member of the Central States Collegiate Hockey League and the women's team competes in the Red Division of the Women's Central Hockey League.  The Illinois Fighting Illini men's ACHA Division II team plays as an independent team in the Central Region. The facility is also the home of the U of I synchronized skating team and several skating clubs.
 
By comparison, an NHL regulation sheet is 200 ft x 85 ft and Olympic regulation ice sheets are 200 ft x 100 ft. The arena is used for ice hockey, figure skating, short track speed skating, open skating, and local youth and high school hockey.

History  
The University of Illinois Ice Arena was built in 1931 and designed by Chicago architecture firm Holabird and Root, the same firm that designed the University of Illinois Memorial Stadium and Chicago's Soldier Field. The arena features four rows of bleacher seating in an elevated balcony that runs the length of the ice rink on either side. These bleachers provide seating for roughly 1,200 fans, with standing room and bench seating available underneath. Because of this set-up the team benches are actually directly underneath the stands. This situation made for easy player/spectator verbal and physical contact. "It was not unheard of to evict a fan and a player due to skirmishes back in the late 1960[s] and [19]70s," said Referee Michael Rzechula.

The first World Short Track Speed Skating Championships were held at this rink in 1976 capable of placing 9 racers instead of 6 on the start line unlike any other rink in the U.S.A.  It was and still is the largest indoor ice sheet in the U.S.A.

This rink has been called home by many and been host to virtually all U.S. World Champion and Olympic speed skaters.  
Local Olympians include: 
Jonathan Kuck, Katherine Reutter, Chantal Bailey, Bonnie Blair, Erik Henriksen, Roger Capan.
It is rumored that the rink will be closed and later demolished in the late 2020s.  Currently (January 2020) there are two sites being discussed for development of 3 new sheets of ice all only 200 ft x 85 ft NHL size which will end the long history of speed skating in Champaign, Illinois.

References

External links
Ice Arena website

Illinois Fighting Illini ice hockey venues
Illinois Fighting Illini men's ice hockey
Ice Arena
Indoor arenas in Illinois
Indoor ice hockey venues in Illinois
College ice hockey venues in the United States
Sports venues in Champaign–Urbana, Illinois
Tourist attractions in Champaign County, Illinois
Buildings and structures in Champaign, Illinois
Event venues established in 1931
Projects by Holabird & Root